Cormeilles-en-Vexin (literally Cormeilles in Vexin) is a commune in the Val-d'Oise department in Île-de-France in northern France.

Education
The commune has a single combined preschool (maternelle) and elementary school, Ecole Jean Jaurès.

See also
Communes of the Val-d'Oise department

References

External links

Association of Mayors of the Val d'Oise 

Communes of Val-d'Oise